Central Park is a major mixed-use urban renewal project in Sydney, New South Wales, Australia located on Broadway in the suburb of Chippendale. For many decades the southern side of Broadway was dominated by a brewery, which closed in the 2000s and the site was put up for sale. Frasers Property purchased the site from the Foster's Group on 29 June 2007. On a difficult site, the design fitted the towers around the streets, created new public spaces and connections to the city, added 30,000 specially selected plants, included art work, and incorporated pedestrian as well as vehicular access.

The project includes the award-winning high-rise building One Central Park, an apartment complex known for its hanging vertical gardens.

Precincts

One Central Park

The first stage of the redevelopment is a tower called One Central Park, a  residential tower designed by Jean Nouvel featuring vertical gardens by Patrick Blanc and LED art by Yann Kersalé. Located opposite the UTS Tower, One Central Park is an apartment complex with a shopping centre called Central Park Mall located on the lower levels. The design includes a cantilevered section including a heliostat to provide light to the parkland below. It is the tallest building on the site. Construction by Watpac Construction was completed in October 2013.

In May 2014, the One Central Park East tower was ranked by Emporis as one of the world's best skyscrapers. In July of the same year, it was chosen as the best tall building in Asia and Australia by the Chicago-based Council for Tall Buildings and Urban Habitat (CTBUH). In November 2014 it was named the best tall building in the world by CTBUH. In October 2014 it was named the Overall Winner of the 2014 LEAF Award.

Park Lane & The Mark
The second and third stages are called Park Lane and The Mark. These are residential buildings designed by Johnson Pilton Walker located adjacent to the new parkland. The Mark is the second tallest building at Central Park.

Commercial buildings
London architects Foster + Partners are the designers behind Central Park's first commercial buildings known as Central Park Mall, which is anchored by Woolworths and features over 75,000 square metres of office and retail space.

Parkland
Central Park includes two parks. In addition to the main park, a pocket park known as the Balfour Street Park was created by closing a section of Balfour Street. The park provides a connection between Central Park and the rest of Chippendale. It opened in April 2010. The main park, called Chippendale Green, opened on 17 December 2012.

Artworks 
Halo, a wind powered kinetic sculpture by Jennifer Turpin and Michaelie Crawford was installed in Central Park in 2012. It involves a ring turning and tilting atop a mast in response to wind.

See also
Other large-scale inner-city urban renewal projects in Sydney:
Barangaroo, New South Wales
Green Square, New South Wales

References

External links

 https://www.centralparkmall.com.au/
 http://www.frasersproperty.com.au/
 http://www.sekisuihouse.com.au/
 https://www.domain.com.au/news/almost-a-decade-on-central-park-is-the-urban-experiment-sydney-got-right-20161103-gshiny/
 http://www.sydneymedia.com.au/2794-city-planning-body-adjusts-density-of-cub-site/

Sydney localities
Shopping centres in Sydney
Railway Square, Sydney